Fond du Lac High School ("Fondy High") is a comprehensive public high school in Fond du Lac, Wisconsin administered by the Fond du Lac School District. Opened in 2001, the school replaced the former Goodrich High School, which was the city's high school from 1922 to 2001. Fond du Lac High School has an enrollment of approximately 2000 students. Fond du Lac High School's athletic teams are known as the Cardinals.

Design 
The educational wing of the school is shaped like an "H". The school is surrounded by retaining ponds, which are fitted with geothermal heat pumps that regulate the temperature of the school during the year. This is saving the school thousands each year in heating and cooling costs.

Academics 
Advanced placement (AP) classes offered at Fond du Lac High School include calculus, chemistry, physics, psychology, U.S. politics and government, biology, U.S History, statistics, computer science, music theory, language and composition, and literature and composition. A few CAPP (Cooperative Academic Partnership Programs) and other concurrent enrollment options are offered by the University of Wisconsin–Oshkosh.

Athletics
The school competes in the Fox Valley Association conference in all sports except football, which is in the Valley Football Association. 24 sports are currently offered:

The football team is notable for having ended two of the longest winning streaks in Wisconsin high school history.  On October 31, 1987, the Cardinals ended the then-record 48-game winning streak of Manitowoc Lincoln Ships with a 27-15 victory at Fruth Field in Fond du Lac in the sectional final (quarterfinals) of the WIAA playoffs.  On August 17, 2018, the Cardinals again snapped a record winning streak, this one the 70-game winning streak of the Kimberly Papermakers, with a 31-28 victory in Kimberly.

Controversy 
In 2014, following publication of an article in the school newspaper about the rape culture in the school, the principal announced that all articles written for the school paper would require his approval before publication. The change in the school's policy led to a petition to reverse the policy change, a student sit-in, and national media attention. The principal resigned at the end of the 2014 school year.

Notable alumni

Braelon Allen, college football running back for the Wisconsin Badgers
Travis Diener, 2001, former professional basketball player
Jim Dilling, national champion high jumper
Bill Guilfoile, American professional baseball public relations executive
Ann Klapperich, former professional basketball player
Kate Everest Levi (1859–1939), social worker, first woman Ph.D. from the University of Wisconsin
Scott McCallum, 1969, 43rd governor of Wisconsin, 41st Lieutenant Governor and 18th District State Senator
Charles Henry Morgan, U.S. Representative from Missouri
John Abner Race, U.S. Representative, 1965-1967
Cory Raymer, former professional football player
Eric Schafer, professional mixed martial arts fighter
Robert Windsor, football player

Images

References

External links

Public high schools in Wisconsin
Fond du Lac, Wisconsin
Educational institutions established in 2001
Schools in Fond du Lac County, Wisconsin
Education in Fond du Lac County, Wisconsin
2001 establishments in Wisconsin